Concord Township is one of the five townships of Lake County, Ohio, United States. As of the 2010 census, the population was 18,201, up from 15,828 at the 2000 census. Lake County is part of the Cleveland-Elyria, OH Metropolitan Statistical Area.

Geography
Located in the center of the county, it borders the following townships and municipalities:
Painesville Township - north
Perry Township - northeast corner
LeRoy Township - east
Hambden Township, Geauga County - southeast
Chardon Township, Geauga County - south
Kirtland Hills - southwest
Mentor - west
Painesville city - northwest

No municipalities are located in Concord Township.

The historical location of the unincorporated settlement of Concord is at the north end of Ohio State Route 608 where it meets Ravenna Road/County Highway 360 (former State Route 44), though most current development in the immediate area is located nearby at the intersection of current State Route 44 and Interstate 90.

Demographics
The population of Concord Township was estimated at 18,134 in 2016.

Name and history
Concord Township was established in 1822. The township's name commemorates the Battle of Concord in the American Revolutionary War. It is one of seven Concord Townships statewide.

Concord began holding Community Days in 1976 and has become an annual tradition ever since. Community Days has been held on Labor Day weekend from 1976 to 2012, when it was moved to the third weekend in August. Activities include a parade, auction, neighborhood softball tournament and fireworks show taking place at Concord Township Hall.

Government

The township is governed by a three-member board of trustees, who are elected in November of odd-numbered years to a four-year term beginning on the following January 1. Two are elected in the year after the presidential election and one is elected in the year before it. There is also an elected township fiscal officer, who serves a four-year term beginning on April 1 of the year after the election, which is held in November of the year before the presidential election. Vacancies in the fiscal officership or on the board of trustees are filled by the remaining trustees.  As of 2020, the board members are Carl Dondorfer, Morgan McIntosh, and Amy Lucci, and the fiscal officer is Amy Dawson.

Public services

Transportation

Education
Schools and school districts located in or near Concord Township include Auburn Career Center, Chardon Local Schools, The Goddard School, Hershey Montessori School, Lakeland Community College, Mentor Exempted Village School District, Riverside Local Schools, and St. Gabriel School (Lake County, Ohio).

The portion of Concord Township in the Mentor school district is divided between the zones of James A. Garfield Elementary School and Hopkins Elementary School. All of the Mentor school district section of Concord Township is zoned to Memorial Middle School. All students in the Mentor school district are zoned to Mentor High School.

Private/Independent Schools 
Hershey Montessori School is an independent Montessori school located in Concord Township. It serves students from two months old through sixth grade. Its seventh through twelfth grade campus is located in nearby Huntsburg, Ohio.

Health
Concord is home to University Hospital Health System and Tri-Point Medical Center, a hospital part of Lake Health. It opened in late 2009.

Businesses
The largest employers are the local and county hospital systems, county government, and the public school systems.

Concord-Painesville JEDD

In 2008, Concord and nearby Painesville formed a Joint Economic Development District to foster economic growth. It consists of a designated area in Concord Township bound by Interstate route 90 and State Road 44. The major participants in the JEDD are Lake Hospital Health Systems, University Hospital Health System, and various real estate development projects. Companies that participate in the JEDD receive tax benefits (based on jobs created), lower cost utilities, tax exemptions for capital improvements, and other benefits. In exchange they agree to a 1.75 percent sales tax which is divided between Concord, Painesville and the JEDD itself.

Other notable companies include:

Avery Dennison, Engineered Films, Regional Industrial and Healthcare Materials - Glendale, CA-based; the Concord plant produces extruded plastic materials, including thin sheets and adhesives used for labeling glass packaging and medical adhesives. The company also has research and production facilities in nearby Painesville and other northeast Ohio locations.

De Nora Tech – multinational; water treatment and purification, electroplating, electrical storage systems; headquartered in Italy with research and manufacturing plants in Concord Township and nearby Mentor, OH.

Fives Group - CITCO Tools – French-owned; manufactures precision machinery for engineering glass, steel, plastics and other materials for use in the energy, metallurgy, aerospace, defense, and other industries. The Concord facility manufactures precision cutting tools and abrasives.

Ranpak – patented recyclable packing and packaging systems, headquartered in Concord with plants in Holland and Singapore.

Ricerca Biosciences – an Italian-owned contract research organization working with life-sciences and pharmaceutical companies to develop and test new compounds.

References

External links

Townships in Lake County, Ohio
Urban townships in Ohio
Townships in Ohio